Meredith Hooper is an Australian historian and writer.

Early life 

She was born and raised in Adelaide, Australia. Hooper graduated in history from the University of Adelaide, then studied imperial history at Oxford.

Career 

She is a member of Association of British Science Writers, Royal Institution and the British Society for the History of Science.

In 2000, the National Science Foundation and the Congress of the United States awarded Hooper the Antarctica Service Medal.
In 2014, Hooper was named the Australian of the Year in the UK.

Bibliography 

 The Longest Winter: Scott's Other Heroes 
 Celebrity Cat: With Paintings from Art Galleries Around the World
 The Pebble in my Pocket: A History of Our Earth
 The Endurance: Shackleton's Perilous Expedition in Antarctica
 The Ferocious Summer: Adelie Penguins and the Warming of Antarctica
 Stranded in the Winter: The Story of Scott’s Northern Party

Personal life 
She is the wife of British civil servant Richard Hooper and mother of film director Tom Hooper. After seeing a 2007 reading of an unproduced play, she told her son she thought he should consider pursuing it for a film adaptation; the project became his Academy Award-winning film, The King's Speech.

References

External links
 http://www.counterpointpress.com/authors/meredith-hooper/

Australian historians
Australian women historians
Living people
Alumni of Nuffield College, Oxford
Alumni of Lady Margaret Hall, Oxford
University of Adelaide alumni
Year of birth missing (living people)